Travis Corey Driskill (born August 1, 1971) is an American former professional baseball pitcher. He bats and throws right-handed. He attended Texas Tech University, where he played for the Red Raiders, and is currently the pitching coach for the Corpus Christi Hooks.

Career
Driskill was drafted in 1990 and 1992 by the Houston Astros and California Angels, respectively, but did not sign. He was drafted again in the fourth round of the 1993 draft by the Cleveland Indians and this time he did sign. Driskill played in the Indians minor league system for the next five years, advancing as high as Triple-A before his contract was purchased by the Yakult Swallows on January 6, 1998. Driskill appeared in seven games as a reliever for the Swallows before he was released and signed back with the Indians in August.

A minor league free agent after the  season, Driskill signed with the Houston Astros, and played the next two seasons in their minor league system. On November 15, 2001, Driskill signed with the Baltimore Orioles. On November 20, 2003, Driskill signed with the Colorado Rockies. He played only one season in Colorado, appearing in five games.

On November 11, 2004, Driskill signed with the Houston Astros and became a free agent after the  season. On December 9, 2005, he signed with the Tampa Bay Devil Rays, but was released on April 2, 2006; on April 14 he resigned with the Astros. Driskill played the next two seasons for Houston's Triple-A affiliate, the Round Rock Express, except for a callup in August , appearing in two games. Driskill retired after the season and accepted an offer from the Astros to become the pitching coach of their Rookie League team, the Greenville Astros.

References

External links

Travis Driskill at Baseball Gauge
Nippon Professional Baseball
Venezuela Winter League

1971 births
Living people
Akron Aeros players
American expatriate baseball players in Canada
American expatriate baseball players in Japan
Baltimore Orioles players
Baseball coaches from Nebraska
Baseball players from Nebraska
Blinn Buccaneers baseball players
Blinn College alumni
Buffalo Bisons (minor league) players
Canton-Akron Indians players
Caribes de Anzoátegui players
Colorado Rockies players
Colorado Springs Sky Sox players
Columbus RedStixx players
Houston Astros players
Kinston Indians players
Leones del Caracas players
American expatriate baseball players in Venezuela
Major League Baseball pitchers
Minor league baseball coaches
Naranjeros de Hermosillo players
American expatriate baseball players in Mexico
New Orleans Zephyrs players
Nippon Professional Baseball pitchers
Ottawa Lynx players
Rochester Red Wings players
Round Rock Express players
Sportspeople from Omaha, Nebraska
Texas Tech Red Raiders baseball players
Texas Tech University alumni
Yakult Swallows players